Roberto Carlos Domínguez Fuentes (born 9 May 1997) is a Salvadoran professional footballer who plays as a centre back for Primera División club FAS and the El Salvador national team.

International career

Youth
Dominguez has played for El Salvador at the under-17, under-20 and under-21 levels.

Senior
Dominguez made his international debut for El Salvador he started and played 90 minutes in a World Cup Qualifying match against Mexico on 13 November 2015.

International goals
Scores and results list El Salvador's goal tally first.

Honours
 Santa Tecla
 Primera División: (3) Clausura 2015, Apertura 2016, Clausura 2017

References

External links
 

1997 births
Living people
Association football central defenders
Salvadoran footballers
People from Chalatenango Department
El Salvador international footballers
2017 Copa Centroamericana players
2017 CONCACAF Gold Cup players
2015 CONCACAF U-20 Championship players
2019 CONCACAF Gold Cup players
C.D. Juventud Independiente players
C.D. FAS footballers
Santa Tecla F.C. footballers
Vancouver Whitecaps FC players
Bolivian Primera División players
Club Bolívar players
Salvadoran expatriate footballers
Salvadoran expatriates in Bolivia
Expatriate footballers in Bolivia
El Salvador youth international footballers